The SS Cheduba was the third ship built at A and J Inglis, Pointhouse, Glasgow. She was probably built in collaboration with Archibald Denny Dumbarton and launched on Saturday, 18 April 1863.

Cheduba was owned by British India Steam Navigation Company Glasgow. She sank with the loss of all hands in the Bay of Bengal on 15 May 1869 while on passage from Calcutta to Rangoon.

References 

1863 ships
Ships built in Glasgow
Victorian-era ships
Maritime incidents in May 1869
Shipwrecks in the Bay of Bengal
Ships lost with all hands
1863 establishments in Scotland